Trotro is a French children's animated television series. The show is about a young donkey named Trotro. The show is based on the books of Bénédicte Guettier. The show is produced in a series of 78 episodes of 4 minutes each.

Credits  
 Director: Eric Cazes and Stephane Lezoray
 Scenario: Mary Luz Drouet (supervision) from the books of Bénédicte Guettier
 Sets: Evelyne Badami
 Storyboards: Lavocat Cecile, Emilie Van Liemt, Jean-Pierre Tardivel
 Animation: Michael Battle, Stephanie Delmas, Philippe Grivot Stephanie Kloutz, Olivier Nicolas, François Bertin
 Music: Francis Médoc, Frédéric Durieux
 Production: Odile Limousin, Delphine Pialot, Jean-Michel Spiner
 Production companies: Storimages, 2 Minutes
 Number of episodes: 78 (2 seasons)
 Time: 4 min
 First publication date: 2004 (France 5)
 Final publication date: 2005 (France 5)

Voice Cast 
Joanna Ruiz as Trotro, Lily, Zoe, Trotro's Mom
Andy Turvey as Trotro's Dad
Julie Ann Dean as Additional Voices

Series overview

Regular series

Episodes

Season 1

Season 2

Other networks

References

2004 French television series debuts
2005 French television series endings
2000s French animated television series
French children's animated television series
Fictional donkeys
Animated television series about children
Animated television series about mammals
French-language television shows